The Eguiturii or Eguituri were a Celto-Ligurian tribe dwelling in the Alpes Maritimae during the Iron Age.

Name 
They are mentioned as Eguituri by Pliny (1st c. AD).

The meaning of the ethnonym Eguituri(i) remains unclear. The original nominative form was probably Eguiturii. The prefix egui- may be a variant of equi-, which can be translated as 'horse', with an archaic preservation of labio-velar -kʷ- (in contrast to Gaul. epos). The suffix -turi(i) may be compared with the ethnic name Turi or Turii (Tyrii), a tribe living nearby in upper Stura valley.

Geography 
The Eguiturii probably dwelled in the upper Verdon valley. Their territory was located east of the Adanates, Gallitae and Bodiontici, west of the Nemeturii, north of the Sentii and Vergunni, and south of the Savincates and Caturiges.

History 
They are mentioned by Pliny the Elder as one of the Alpine tribes conquered by Rome in 16–15 BC, and whose name was engraved on the Tropaeum Alpium.

References

Primary sources

Bibliography 

Historical Celtic peoples
Gauls
Tribes of pre-Roman Gaul